Alavi (also Romanized as ‘Alavī; also known as Al Hā’ī and Beyt-e Alhā’ī) is a village in Ahudasht Rural District, Shavur District, Shush County, Khuzestan Province, Iran. At the 2006 census, its population was 334, in 46 families.

References 

Populated places in Shush County